Karl Johan Svensson-Sarland (12 March 1887 – 20 January 1964) was a Swedish gymnast. He was part of the Swedish teams that won gold medals at the 1908 and 1912 Summer Olympics. He was a civil engineer by trade.

References

1887 births
1964 deaths
Swedish male artistic gymnasts
Gymnasts at the 1908 Summer Olympics
Gymnasts at the 1912 Summer Olympics
Olympic gymnasts of Sweden
Olympic gold medalists for Sweden
Olympic medalists in gymnastics
Medalists at the 1912 Summer Olympics
Medalists at the 1908 Summer Olympics